Marin Draganja and Mate Pavić were the defending champions, but did not compete this year.

Roman Jebavý and Jaroslav Pospíšil won the title by defeating Stephan Fransen and Robin Haase 6–4, 6–2 in the final.

Seeds

Draw

Draw

References
 Main Draw

ATP Challenger Trophy - Doubles
STRABAG Challenger Open